Sheila Allen (22 October 1932 – 13 October 2011) was an English actress, who was best known to the wider public for her role on television as Cassie Manson in Bouquet Of Barbed Wire and its sequel Another Bouquet (1976–77). From 1966 to 1978, Allen was a member of the Royal Shakespeare Company.

Early life and stage work
Allen was born in Chard, Somerset, to Dorothy Essex (née Potter) and William Allen. She was educated at Howell’s School, Denbigh and trained at the Royal Academy of Dramatic Art (RADA) from 1949 to 1951.

From the 1950s, Allen appeared in plays by Shakespeare. Her first leading role was that of Katherine ("the shrew") in The Taming of the Shrew for the Arena Company in Birmingham (1954–56). Among many other Shakespearean roles, she played Hippolyta in A Midsummer Night's Dream with the Bristol Old Vic Company, a production that moved to London (1957–58) and Portia (The Merchant of Venice, Old Vic, London, 1962). She joined the Royal Shakespeare Company at The Aldwych in 1966. Her roles included Lady Percy (Henry IV, Parts I and II) (RSC, Stratford, 1966), Lady Macduff (Macbeth, RSC, Stratford and London, 1968), Lady Capulet (Romeo and Juliet, RSC, Stratford, 1967), and Helen (Troilus and Cressida, RSC, Stratford, 1968).  For the RSC, she played Goneril in King Lear twice, in 1968 and 1974, for respectively Trevor Nunn and Buzz Goodbody. At the Shaw Theatre, London in 1973, she played Lady Macbeth, with Tom Baker as Macbeth.

Allen appeared in new plays as well, such as Pam Gems Queen Christina which debuted at the RSC's Other Place in 1977. In his obituary of Allen in 2011, Michael Billington considered it "the role of a lifetime and enabled her to inspire comparisons to [Greta] Garbo in her ability to capture the cross-dressing monarch's sexual ambivalence and inner contest between desire and duty."

Television and film
Allen appeared in guest roles with Patrick McGoohan in episodes of Danger Man ("Don't Nail Him Yet", 1964) and The Prisoner ("A. B. and C.", 1967). In the episode of The Prisoner, Allen was Number 14, a scientist who was one of many who failed in "the Village" to elicit from Number 6 (McGoohan) why he had resigned from a certain organisation. She was pressed by Number 2 (Colin Gordon) to use a new wonder drug and archive film to influence her subject's dreams, but he was able to manipulate the process and thereby to cause the downfall of Number 2. When not dressed in her subterranean laboratory in a white coat with her hair tied back, Number 14 was seen with flowing hair, walking around the Village in a cape of many colours.

In Bouquet of Barbed Wire (1976), based on a novel by Andrea Newman and described by Philip Purser as a "kinky saga which was much discussed ... well made and acted", Allen's character was the wife of Peter Manson (Frank Finlay), who had an unhealthy obsession about his married daughter, Prue (Susan Penhaligon). Among many sexual entanglements, Cassie had an affair with Gavin Sorenson (James Aubrey), her own son-in-law. She also portrayed the Matron Mary Taylor in the television series Shroud for a Nightingale (1984), based on the P.D. James novel. 

Her many film credits include The Prince and the Pauper (1962), Children of the Damned (1964), The Alphabet Murders (1965), Three into Two Won't Go (1969), Venom (1971), The Other Side of the Underneath (1972), Pascali's Island (1988), Shining Through (1992), Love Actually (2003) and Harry Potter and the Goblet of Fire (2005). Allen continued to work into the 21st century, and taught at the Guildford School of Acting.

Death
Allen died in London on 13 October 2011, nine days before her 79th birthday.

Filmography

Film

Television

References

External links

 Still of Sheila Allen in The Prisoner (1967)

1932 births
2011 deaths
Actresses from Somerset
English film actresses
English stage actresses
English television actresses
People from Chard, Somerset
Royal Shakespeare Company members
English Shakespearean actresses
Alumni of RADA